The 4th constituency of Oise is a French legislative constituency in the Oise département.

Description

The 4th constituency of the Oise covers the south eastern corner of the department. It includes Parc Asterix.

From 1988 to 2017, the seat was held continuously by conservative deputies firstly Arthur Dehaine of the RPR, and since 2002 by Éric Woerth a former minister in the François Fillon governments. The seat was gained by LREM when Woerth defected to LREM.

Historic Representation

Election results

2022 

 
 
 
 
 
|-
| colspan="8" bgcolor="#E9E9E9"|
|-
 
 

 
 
 
 
 

* LREM dissident, not supported by Ensemble Citoyens alliance.

2017

2012

 
 
 
 
 
|-
| colspan="8" bgcolor="#E9E9E9"|
|-

Sources
Official results of French elections from 2002: "Résultats électoraux officiels en France" (in French).

4